Man of Steel is a musical written by Simon Denver and Ian Dorricott, first published in 1978. Written for performance by schools and drama groups, Man of Steel is based on the story of Superman, with a comedic spin.

Characters

Protagonists

Ken Clarke / Man of Steel
Linda Street
Bobby Benson
Rita 
Lil
Marg
Fan Club Leader
Edna
Gerry Black
Ruby

Antagonists

Bugsy
Killer
Knuckles
Crusher
Olga
Apprentice Henchmen

Minor

Old Woman
Fanclub Members
Policeman

Musical Numbers 
 Prelude to Act One (Clap Your Hands for the Man of Steel)
 Bad Girl 
 Clap Your Hands for the Man of Steel
 Everybody Needs a Superhero
 I'm Just a Loser
 I've Got the Power
 Landlady Blues
 Man of Steel Fanfare
 Man of Steel, I Really Love You So
 Prelude to Act II (Won't Someone Tell Me?)
 The Man of Steel Fan Club Song 
 The Raspberry 
 We've Got the News! 
 Won't Someone Tell me?
 You're a Gangster 
 Exit Music (Man of Steel, I Really Love You So)

References 

1978 musicals
Australian musicals